The Atlanta Financial Center is a 914,747-square-foot office building complex located in Buckhead, Atlanta, Georgia. The office complex is situated directly over the Georgia 400 highway and features a black aluminum/glass-frame design, composed of three interconnected towers: an 11-story South Tower, a 12-story North Tower and a 19-story East Tower. The Atlanta Financial Center is situated next to MARTA's Red Line Buckhead station; the Red Line runs directly underneath the complex.

Atlanta Financial Center was awarded a LEED silver certification in 2012.

History
Atlanta Financial Center originated as an 11-story office building serving the Robinson-Humphrey Company bank (now known as SunTrust Bank, who still occupies the building), which was completed in 1982. In 1984, Robinson-Humphrey was ready to proceed with plans to construct the 19-story East Tower expansion, which was in line with a proposed route for the controversial Georgia State Route 400 extension. A compromise was worked out for Fulton County to pay $3 million to Robinson-Humphrey to offset extra construction costs. The deal called for the tower to be constructed with special concrete supports allowing for the highway and eventual MARTA Red Line to run underneath; the deal also covered Robinson-Humphrey's $1 million donation of the right-of-way to the Georgia DOT. The road and rail line is sealed off with concrete to protect the building from noise and vibration. Construction of the highway underneath the East Tower and parking garage was underway in 1990; the highway opened to traffic in 1993 and the rail line followed three years later, opening in 1996.

In 2001, the property was sold to Hines Interests Limited Partnership and General Motors Asset Management for $154 million; the partnership purchased the property from Overseas Partners Capital Corp., who purchased the complex for $123 million in 1996. The complex was once again sold in 2016 to Sumitomo Corporation of America for $222.5 million. Sumitomo plans to embark on upgrades to the complex's common areas, amenities, building systems and equipment, and re-landscaping the park on-site.

Tenants

References

External links
 
 Atlanta Financial Center - Emporis

Office buildings in Atlanta
Office buildings completed in 1982
1982 establishments in Georgia (U.S. state)
Leadership in Energy and Environmental Design basic silver certified buildings